IEEE Micro is a peer-reviewed scientific journal published by the IEEE Computer Society covering small systems and semiconductor chips, including integrated circuit processes and practices, project management, development tools and infrastructure, as well as chip design and architecture, empirical evaluations of small system and IC technologies and techniques, and human and social aspects of system development.

Editors-in-chief 

The following people have been editor-in-chief:

 2019–present: Lizy Kurian John
 2015–2018: Lieven Eeckhout
 2011–2014: Erik R. Altman
 2007–2010: David H. Albonesi
 2003–2006: Pradip Bose
 1999–2001: Ken Sakamura
 1995–1998: Steve Diamond
 1991–1994: Dante Del Corso
 1987–1990: Joe Hootman
 1985–1987: James J. Farrell III
 1983–1984: Peter Rony and Tom Cain
 1980–1982: Richard C. Jaeger

External links 
 

Micro
Computer science journals
Bimonthly journals
English-language journals
Publications established in 1981